The 2019 Starrcade was the 21st and final Starrcade professional wrestling livestreaming event. It was the third Starrcade promoted by WWE and was held as a live event for wrestlers from the promotion's Raw and SmackDown brand divisions. A portion of the event was livestreamed as a one-hour WWE Network special. It took place on December 1, 2019, at the Infinite Energy Arena in Duluth, Georgia. Due to the COVID-19 pandemic, an event was not held in 2020 and no further events have been scheduled since.

Eleven matches were contested on the card, four of which were broadcast live for the one-hour WWE Network special. In the main event of the non-televised live show, "The Fiend" Bray Wyatt defeated Braun Strowman in a steel cage match to retain SmackDown's Universal Championship, while in the main event of the televised portion of the show, Bobby Lashley defeated Kevin Owens by disqualification.

Part-way through the broadcast, WWE began to stream the remainder of the special on YouTube; the WWE Network experienced a major service outage predominantly in the eastern United States.

Production

Background 
Starrcade was a live closed-circuit event that was conceived in 1983 by Dusty Rhodes. The event was originally produced under the National Wrestling Alliance (NWA) banner by NWA member Jim Crockett Promotions (JCP). The NWA and JCP regarded Starrcade as their flagship event of the year, much in the same vein that its rival, the World Wrestling Federation (WWF), would begin to regard WrestleMania two years later. In 1988, JCP was sold to Turner Broadcasting and became World Championship Wrestling (WCW), with Starrcade being held by WCW until 2000; WCW and its assets were acquired by the WWF the following year (the WWF itself was renamed to WWE in 2002).
 
After a 17-year hiatus, WWE revived Starrcade as a live event on November 25, 2017, held exclusively for wrestlers from the promotion's SmackDown brand division. On November 24, 2018, WWE held a second Starrcade event, featuring wrestlers from both Raw and SmackDown, with a portion of the event airing on tape delay as a one-hour WWE Network special on November 25, 2018. On September 17, 2019, WWE announced that its third Starrcade event, again featuring Raw and SmackDown, would take place on December 1, 2019, held at the Infinite Energy Arena in Duluth, Georgia. Like the previous year, a portion aired as a one-hour WWE Network special, but unlike the previous year, the one-hour special was livestreamed.

Storylines 

Starrcade consisted  of professional wrestling matches that involved various different wrestlers from pre-existing scripted feuds and storylines. Wrestlers portrayed heroes, villains, or less distinguishable characters in scripted events that built tension and culminated in a wrestling match or series of matches. Results were predetermined by WWE's writers on the Raw and SmackDown brands, while storylines were produced on WWE's weekly television shows, Monday Night Raw and Friday Night SmackDown.

Aftermath
The 2019 Starrcade would in turn be the final Starrcade, as an event for 2020 was not scheduled due to the COVID-19 pandemic, which caused the cancelation of all live events outside of WWE's main shows, which were held behind closed doors. WWE resumed live touring in July 2021, but a Starrcade event was not scheduled for that year.

Results

References 

2019 in Georgia (U.S. state)
2019 WWE Network events
December 2019 events in the United States
Events in Georgia (U.S. state)
Professional wrestling in Georgia (U.S. state)
2019
Events in Duluth, Georgia